Yaritza Adames Núñez (born 4 October 1993) is a Dominican footballer who plays as a midfielder. She has been a member of the Dominican Republic women's national team.

International career
Adames capped for the Dominican Republic at senior level during the 2014 Central American and Caribbean Games.

References 

1993 births
Living people
Women's association football midfielders
Dominican Republic women's footballers
Dominican Republic women's international footballers
Competitors at the 2014 Central American and Caribbean Games